Mikhail Mikhailovich Klimov (Russian: Михаил Михайлович Климов; November 20, 1880July 9, 1942) was a Soviet and Russian stage and film actor. People's Artist of the USSR (1937).

From 1909 to 1940 he was a leading actor of the Maly theatre. During the 1920s and 1930s he was also a popular film actor, he usually played roles of the main hero's antagonists.

Filmography

Awards and honors 

 Honored Artist of the RSFSR (1928)
 People's Artist of the RSFSR (1933)
 People's Artist of the USSR (1937)
 Order of the Red Banner of Labour (1937)

References

  Biography at the Maly Theatre website

1880 births
1942 deaths
20th-century Russian male actors
Male actors from Saint Petersburg
Male actors from the Russian Empire
Honored Artists of the RSFSR
People's Artists of the RSFSR
People's Artists of the USSR
Recipients of the Order of the Red Banner of Labour
Russian male film actors
Russian male silent film actors
Russian male stage actors

Soviet male film actors
Soviet male silent film actors
Soviet male stage actors